Euoplia polyspila is a species of beetle in the family Cerambycidae, and the only species in the genus Euoplia. It was described by Hope in 1939.

References

Lamiini
Beetles described in 1939